Rakwana electoral district was an electoral district of Sri Lanka between March 1960 and February 1989. The district was named after the town of Rakwana in Ratnapura District, Sabaragamuwa Province. The 1978 Constitution of Sri Lanka introduced the proportional representation electoral system for electing members of Parliament. The existing 160 mainly single-member electoral districts were replaced with 22 multi-member electoral districts. Rakwana electoral district was replaced by the Ratnapura multi-member electoral district at the 1989 general elections.

Members of Parliament
Key

Elections

1960 (March) Parliamentary General Election
Results of the 4th parliamentary election held on 19 March 1960:

1960 (July) Parliamentary General Election
Results of the 5th parliamentary election held on 20 July 1960:

1965 Parliamentary General Election
Results of the 6th parliamentary election held on 22 March 1965:

1970 Parliamentary General Election
Results of the 7th parliamentary election held on 27 May 1970:

1977 Parliamentary General Election
Results of the 8th parliamentary election held on 21 July 1977:

References

Former electoral districts of Sri Lanka
Politics of Ratnapura District